Ana Chaves Bay is a bay on the northeast coast of São Tomé Island in São Tomé and Príncipe. The capital city of São Tomé and its port are situated by the bay. It stretches from the Ponta Oque del Rei in the north to Ponta São Sebastião in the south. Forte de São Sebastião, now part of São Sebastião Museum, occupies Ponta São Sebastião. It is the main port of the country for solid goods; the port of Neves is the main point of entry for liquid fuels.

There is a lighthouse at Ponta Oque del Rei at the northwestern end of the bay, built in 1994. Another light is the São Sebastião Lighthouse at the southeastern end of the bay, built in 1928.

In 2011, the government of São Tomé and Príncipe granted a long-term concession to Angolan state oil company Sonangol to control and develop the port in which Sonangol have been reported to have invested US$30 million in developing a free trade zone.

See also
List of ports in São Tomé and Príncipe

References

External links

Bays of São Tomé and Príncipe
São Tomé
Ports and harbours in Africa
Ports and harbours of the Atlantic Ocean